Zirkan (also Romanized as Zīrkān and Zīr Kān) is a village in Mehranrud-e Markazi Rural District, in the Central District of Bostanabad County, East Azerbaijan Province, Iran. At the 2006 census, its population was 284, in 56 families.

References 

Populated places in Bostanabad County